Thomas Henry Catterson (August 25, 1884 in Warwick, Rhode Island – February 5, 1920 in Portland, Maine), was a professional baseball player "TomCat" who played right field outfield from 1908 to 1909 for the Brooklyn Superbas later called "Brooklyn Dodgers". He graduated 1905 with business degree from Villanova University and was their star pitcher having gained fame in defeating Georgetown university in key playoff game in 1905.

He died from flu at his home in Portland, Maine on February 5, 1920.

References

External links

1884 births
1920 deaths
Major League Baseball outfielders
Brooklyn Superbas players
Baseball players from Rhode Island
Villanova University alumni
Brockton Tigers players
Lawrence Colts players
Lawrence Barristers players
Meriden Hopes players
New London Planters players